The 2012 African Men's Junior Handball Championship was the 18th edition of the tournament, organized by the African Handball Confederation, under the auspices of the International Handball Federation and held in Abidjan, Ivory Coast from August 28 to September 2, 2012.

Tunisia was the champion and the tournament qualified the top five teams to the 2013 world championship.

Draw

Squads

Preliminary round
11 teams were drawn into two groups of five and six, respectively, with the two top teams of each group playing for the title, the two second, playing for the bronze medal, the two third, playing for the 5th place, the two fourth for the 7th place and the two fifth teams playing for the 7th place.

All times are local (UTC+1).

Group A

Group B

Classification matches

Ninth place game

Seventh place game

Fifth place game

Third place game

Final

Final standings

Awards

See also
 2012 African Men's Handball Championship
 2012 African Men's Youth Handball Championship

References

External links
Official Competition Page

2012 in handball
African Men's Junior Handball Championship
International handball competitions hosted by Ivory Coast
Junior